Dimitrios Markomichalis (born 27 December 1979) is a retired Greek footballer who played as a midfielder.

References

1979 births
Living people
A.O Pefki F.C. players
Ionikos F.C. players
Aris Thessaloniki F.C. players
Niki Volos F.C. players
Ilisiakos F.C. players
Kallithea F.C. players
Association football midfielders
Super League Greece players
Footballers from Athens
Greek footballers